Rucava Parish is an administrative unit of South Kurzeme Municipality, Latvia. The parish has a population of 1250 (as of 1/07/2010) and covers an area of 238.1 km2.

Villages of Rucava Parish 

Parishes of Latvia
South Kurzeme Municipality
Courland